Anton August Beck (27 August 1713, Braunschweig - 17 March 1787, Braunschweig) was a German engraver. He was the son of Johann Georg Beck and his wife Anna Elisabeth. On Johann's death, his student Johann Georg Schmidt married his widow and adopted his business. On Schmidt's death, Anton took over the business.

Notes

1713 births
1787 deaths
German engravers
Artists from Braunschweig
People from Brunswick-Lüneburg